Radka Felingerová (born 1978) is a former born Czech British female canoeist who won two medals at individual senior level at the Wildwater Canoeing World Championships.

References

1978 births
Living people
British female canoeists
Place of birth missing (living people)